The family Apodanthaceae comprises about 10 species of endoparasitic herbs. They live in the branches or stems of their hosts (as filaments similar to a fungal mycelium), emerging only to flower and fruit. The plants produce no green parts and do not carry out any photosynthesis (that is, they are holoparasitic). There are two genera: Pilostyles and Apodanthes. A third genus, Berlinianche, was never validly published. Mitochondrial and nuclear DNA sequences confidently place the Apodanthaceae in the Cucurbitales, where they also fit well in terms of their flower morphology.

External links
Parasitic Plant Connection: Apodanthaceae

References

 
Parasitic plants
Rosid families